Larry Rosenstock was the C.E.O. of the San Diego-based High Tech High, a network of charter schools and a graduate school of education.
He is also the President of the HTH Graduate School of Education.

Education
He got his Bachelor of Arts in Psychology at Brandeis University in 1970. In 1985 got a Master's of Education in Education Administration at Cambridge College.
In 1986 he received a law degree from Boston University School of Law.

Career

During and after law school at Boston University, Rosenstock taught carpentry and woodworking classes to urban youth for a total of eleven years. He also worked as staff attorney for two years at the Harvard Center for Law and Education, and was a lecturer at the Harvard Graduate School of Education for five years. He was a principal of the Rindge School of Technical Arts, and of the Cambridge Rindge and Latin School. He created a program “CityWorks”, which won the Ford Foundation Innovations in State and Local Government Award in 1992.

Rosenstock was the director from 1996-1997 of the New Urban High School Project, an effort funded by the U.S. Department of Education to find and describe new models for urban high schools. Rosenstock and his team created three design principles that seemed to be common in the successful urban high schools that they found. These design principles are personalization, real-world connection, and common intellectual mission.

He moved to San Diego to become the president of the Price Charitable Fund from 1997-1999.

In 2000, Rosenstock became the C.E.O. and founding principal of High Tech High, first one school and now part of the High Tech High umbrella organization that currently runs sixteen schools in California.

Awards include being named an Ashoka Fellow in 2002  and a Harold W. McGraw, Jr. Prize in Education winner in 2010.

References

Education in San Diego
High Tech High charter schools
Living people
Year of birth missing (living people)
Ashoka USA Fellows